Teresa Medeiros (born 1962/1963) is an American award-winning romance novelist. She wrote her first novel at 21. Before becoming an author, she was a nurse.  According to her official biography, she lives in Kentucky.

Her books have appeared on The New York Times Best Seller list. She is a two-time Fantasy, Futuristic, and Paranormal Romance Writers PRISM Award winner, and two-time recipient of the Waldenbooks Award for bestselling fiction. Additionally she is a charter member of the Romance Writers of America Honor Roll.  She is also a member of Kentucky Romance Writers and Novelists, Inc.

Bibliography

The Lennox Family Magic Series

Breath of Magic (March 1996)
Touch of Enchantment (July 1997)

The Fairy Tale Series

Charming the Prince (April 1999)
The Bride and the Beast (April 2001)

The Fairleigh Sisters Series

A Kiss to Remember (May 2002)
One Night of Scandal (August 2003)

The Kane/Cabot Vampire Series

After Midnight (September 2005)
The Vampire Who Loved Me (October 2006)

The Kincaid Highland Series
Some Like It Wicked (August 2008)
Some Like It Wild (April 2009)

The Burke Brothers Series
The Pleasure of Your Kiss (January 2012)
The Temptation of Your Touch (January 2013)

Contemporary
Goodnight Tweetheart (December 2010)

Single Novels
Lady of Conquest (August 1989)
Shadows and Lace (September 1990)
Heather and Velvet (June 1992)
Once an Angel (April 1993)
A Whisper of Roses (October 1993)
Thief of Hearts (September 1994)
Fairest of Them All (May 1995)
Nobody's Darling (April 1998)
Yours Until Dawn (August 2004)
The Devil Wears Plaid (September 2010)

References

External links
Official website
HarperCollins: Teresa Medeiros

1962 births
20th-century American novelists
21st-century American novelists
American women novelists
American romantic fiction writers
Living people
University of Kentucky alumni
Women romantic fiction writers
20th-century American women writers
21st-century American women writers
Kentucky women writers